Liverpool Street can refer to:

Liverpool Street station, a major mainline railway station in central London, UK
Liverpool Street bus station, located adjacent to the London railway station
Liverpool Street station, a station on the underground London Post Office Railway
Liverpool Street, Hobart, a major street in Hobart, Australia
Liverpool Street, Sydney, an important thoroughfare in the central business district of Sydney, Australia
Liverpool Street, one of the streets named for European cities in the Zona Rosa, Mexico City